Jakub Hanák (born 26 March 1983 in Uherské Hradiště) is a Czech rower.

References
 
 

1983 births
Living people
Czech male rowers
Olympic silver medalists for the Czech Republic
Rowers at the 2004 Summer Olympics
Rowers at the 2008 Summer Olympics
People from Uherské Hradiště
Olympic rowers of the Czech Republic
Olympic medalists in rowing
Medalists at the 2004 Summer Olympics
World Rowing Championships medalists for the Czech Republic
European Rowing Championships medalists
Sportspeople from the Zlín Region